The Cabinet of Kyriakos Mitsotakis was sworn in on 9 July 2019, following the Greek legislative election in July 2019. Kyriakos Mitsotakis, leader of New Democracy, was sworn in as Prime Minister of Greece on 8 July.

The government consists of a total of 58 members, including 21 ministers, 5 alternate ministers and 30 deputy ministers. Of these, 37 are elected members of the Hellenic Parliament and 21 are unelected technocrats. Nine members of the government are women.

Prime and Deputy Prime Ministers

Ministers

Full ministers (in bold in the table below) are responsible for:
 the identification of ministerial policy in the cabinet
 the representation in bodies of the European Union
 the appointment of administrative agencies, public services and personnel

Alternate Ministers are directly assigned special responsibilities and powers by the prime minister, including:
 full parliamentary powers and, in conjunction with the minister, the legislative initiative 
 the right to issue individual and normative acts, and to propose individual and normative decrees

Deputy ministers are assigned with responsibilities and powers by the prime minister and the full minister they report to. Deputy ministers may attend cabinet meetings.

Ministers of State

Note: An asterisk (*) indicates an elected member of the Hellenic Parliament.

References

Mitsotakis, Kyriakos
Cabinets established in 2019
2019 in Greek politics
2019 establishments in Greece
New Democracy (Greece)
Mitsotakis